Arthur H. Murphy (August 24, 1831 – October 27, 1903) was an entrepreneur and political figure in Quebec. He represented Québec-Ouest in the Legislative Assembly of Quebec from 1878 to 1881 as a Liberal.

He was born in Notre-Dame de Québec, Lower Canada, the son of Daniel Murphy and Ellen Murphy, and was educated there. Murphy was involved in shipping on the Great Lakes and owned a lumber business at Quebec City and phosphate and asbestos mines at Thetford Mines, Templeton and Black Lake. He was also a commissioner for the Turnpike Trust. Murphy married Marie Roach. He served on the municipal council for Quebec City. He ran unsuccessfully for a seat in the Quebec assembly in an 1877 by-election before being elected in 1878. Murphy died at Montreal at the age of 72.

References
 

1831 births
1903 deaths
Politicians from Quebec City
Quebec Liberal Party MNAs
Anglophone Quebec people